John Charles Beyer (born 20 April 1950) is a former British diplomat who was Ambassador to Moldova.

Education
Beyer was educated at Abingdon School from 1961 until 1968. He then attended the University of Cambridge and from 1982-1984 taught at the University of Westminster.

Career
From 1984-1988 he was Deputy Director of the Sino-British Trade Council and Director of the China-Britain Trade Group from 1991-1998. In 1999 he joined the Foreign and Commonwealth Office as Head of Section for the European Union Department and was then Deputy Head of Mission for Luxembourg. (2002-2005)

He succeeded Bernard Whiteside in 2006 as Ambassador to Moldova and in 2009 was replaced by Keith Shannon.

John Beyer is currently an Academic Visitor in the European Studies Centre for St Antony's College, Oxford.

See also
 List of Old Abingdonians

References

1950 births
Living people
Ambassadors of the United Kingdom to Moldova
People educated at Abingdon School